Although many paths may lead to the presidency of the United States, the most common job experience, occupation or profession of U.S. presidents has been that of a lawyer. This sortable table enumerates all holders of that office, along with major elective or appointive offices or periods of military service prior to election to the presidency. The column immediately to the right of the presidents' names shows the position or office held just before the presidency. The next column to the right lists the next previous position held, and so on. Note that the total number of previous positions held by an individual may exceed four; the number of columns was limited to what would fit within the page width. The last two columns on the right list the home state (at the time of election to the presidency) and primary occupation of each future president, prior to beginning a political career.

By the numbers
There have been 46 presidencies (including the current president, Joe Biden, whose term began in 2021), and 45 people have served as president. Grover Cleveland was elected to two nonconsecutive terms, and as such is considered the 22nd and 24th president of the United States. Of the 45 different people who have been or are currently serving as president:
32  presidents had previous military experience; 9 were generals in the US Army.
27  presidents were previously lawyers.
18  presidents previously served as U.S. representatives; 6 of 18 held this office prior to the four 'previous positions' shown in this table. Only one – James A. Garfield – was  a representative immediately before election as president. Only Garfield and Abraham Lincoln had served in no higher office than representative when elected president. Only John Quincy Adams served as a U.S. representative after being president. Additionally, after being president, John Tyler served in the Provisional Confederate Congress and was later elected to the Confederate House of Representatives, but he died before taking his seat.
19 presidents previously served as governors; 17 presidents  were state governors; 9 were governors immediately before election as presidents. One, William Howard Taft, served as a territorial governor. One, Andrew Jackson, served as a military governor. (Florida, before it became a state). Jackson served in Florida, before it was a state. Johnson served in Tennessee during the Civil War.
17  presidents previously served as U.S. senators; only 3 immediately before election as president. Only one president, Andrew Johnson, served as a U.S. senator after his presidency.
15  presidents previously served as vice presidents. All except Richard Nixon and Joe Biden were vice presidents immediately before becoming president; 9 of the 15 succeeded to the presidency upon the death or (in one case) resignation of the elected president; 5 of those 9 were not later elected.
9  presidents were out of office (for at least one year) immediately before election as president.
8  presidents previously served as Cabinet secretaries; 6 as secretary of state; 5 of the 8 served immediately before election as president.
7  presidents had previous experience in foreign service.
5 presidents had never been elected to public office before becoming president: Zachary Taylor, Ulysses S. Grant, Herbert Hoover, Dwight D. Eisenhower, and Donald Trump. Most of these had, however, been appointed to several prominent offices. Hoover's contributions toward the Treaty of Versailles preceded his appointment as United States Secretary of Commerce. Taylor, Grant, and Eisenhower led U.S. forces to victory in the Mexican–American War, American Civil War, and World War II, respectively – each occupying the highest-ranking command post of their time. Trump is the group's sole exception, having never held any public office nor any military position.
5 presidents taught at a university: James A. Garfield, William Howard Taft, Woodrow Wilson, Bill Clinton, and Barack Obama.
2 presidents served as party leaders of the House of Representatives, James A. Garfield and Gerald Ford.
1 president served as an ordained minister, serving as a pastor in the Disciples of Christ (Christian) Church, James A. Garfield.
1 president served as speaker of the House of Representatives, James K. Polk.
1 president served as president pro tempore of the United States Senate, John Tyler.
1 president served as party leader of the United States Senate, Lyndon B. Johnson.
1 president served as president of the United States for two non-consecutive terms, Grover Cleveland.
1 president had a PhD, Woodrow Wilson.
1 president had neither prior government nor military experience before becoming president, Donald Trump.

List

See also
 President of the United States
 List of presidents of the United States by other offices held

Notes

References

United States
Lists relating to the United States presidency
United States presidential history